The following is a list of international trips made by Kim Il-sung during his tenure as General Secretary of the Central Committee of the Workers' Party of Korea,  Premier and President of North Korea. His first international state visit was to the Soviet Union in 1949.

The number of visits per country where he traveled are:

 One visit to Albania, Indonesia, Mauritania and Algeria only Indonesia, Mauritania and Algeria being non communist countries
 Two visits to Czechoslovakia, East Germany, Hungary, Poland, Mongolia, North Vietnam and Yugoslavia
 Three visits to Bulgaria and Romania
 Ten visits to the Soviet Union
 Eleven visits to China

Summary of official trips

1949

1950s

1960s

According to some reports, two secret meetings were rumored to have been held between Kim and Soviet leader Leonid Brezhnev in 1966 and 1968 in the USSR, with the first theorized to have taken place on the Soviet cruiser Varyag.

1970s

1980s

1991

See also

 List of international trips made by Kim Jong-un
 List of international trips made by Kim Jong-il
 North Korean leaders' trains
 
 Awards and decorations received by Kim Il-sung

References

External links
 Kim Ir sen v Praze 1984/Kim Il-sung in Prague 1984
 Kim ll Sung and Mao Tse Tung (1970) Video Archive

State visits by North Korean leaders
Kim Il-sung
Diplomacy-related lists